Willunga is a town located to the south of Adelaide, South Australia in the City of Onkaparinga local government area, 47 km from the Adelaide city centre. This town has been considered a suburb of the Adelaide metropolitan area, and it is located within the McLaren Vale wine-growing region. In the 2016 census, Willunga recorded a population of 2,308.

Willunga is connected to the town of McLaren Vale by a cycle path running along a former railway line and is nearby to the beaches of Aldinga Bay. Multiple festivals are hosted in Willunga, including the start and finish of the fourth leg of the Tour Down Under, the Fleurieu Folk Festival, the Almond Blossom Festival, and the Willunga Christmas Tree Festival.

History
Historically, Willunga is well known for its slate industry, which began in 1840 when a farmer named Edward Loud found slate on his property and later that year opened the first slate quarry.

The name Willunga derives from the Aboriginal word 'willangga' meaning, 'the locality of green trees'.

Willunga Post Office opened on 14 July 1839.

Commerce
Being one of South Australia's earliest towns, Willunga is a small country town which attracts many visitors. Businesses in Willunga include coffee shops, eateries, a post office, a general store, three hotels, and one fuel station. There are four churches, including an Anglican, a Catholic, a Uniting, and a Pentecostal church.

Tourism

Willunga has an eighteen-hole golf course with a restaurant open to the public. On the same property is the Willunga Bowling Club and the Waverley Homestead, home of a community arts organisation called STARS.

Most of Willunga's large events are held on the Willunga-owned Recreation Park, located near the town square. The Willunga National Trust, opens its old courthouse and slate museums on weekends and Tuesdays. Its grounds accommodate various events including weddings.

Willunga hosts a leg of the Tour Down Under cycle race (including King of the Mountain) every summer. Other attractions are the Willunga Farmers' Market (which won Best Farmers' Market in Australia 2008) held every Saturday morning; the Willunga Quarry Market, Willunga Artisans' Market and CWA Teas, Cake & Crafts all held second Saturday of each month; and the Willunga Lions Auction usually held the last Saturday of each month except December.

The Adelaide Hills Tarmac Rally is held annually near Willunga.

Media 
Tribe FM 91.1 is an Australian community radio station which broadcasts from Willunga. It is run by volunteers and services the mid-south coast and surrounding areas. The station live streams online and has some additional on-demand programs available on their website. The station won the 2018 SACBA Bilby Award for sports broadcasting. The team responsible for the winning program includes the South Australian parliamentarian, Katrine Hildyard.

Willunga was home to a short-lived publication, printed by Matthew Goode, known as the Willunga Bulletin (1907). A generic medical broadsheet, it was essentially a four-page promotion for the American-based Dr Sheldon's medicines.

Sports 
Willunga has many sporting teams, including a football team (the Demons); a football team for students; a netball club, a basketball club, tennis club and a cricket club. Also, the township has a soccer club, in the NDJSA league.

Walking and cycling trails
The Coast to Vines rail trail finishes at Willunga.

Education

Willunga has three schools serving the town and local area: Willunga Waldorf Steiner School (K-12), Willunga Primary School and kindergarten, and Willunga High School, which opened on its present site in 1960.
Prior to 1960, tertiary education was provided at the Willunga "Higher Primary" school for years 8 to 11.
It was situated in school Buildings at the corner of Main Road and Aldinga road.
It closed at the end of 1959 when the new Willunga High School was completed on Main road north of the town

National Broadband Network deployment
Willunga was chosen as one of the first five release areas for the National Broadband Network. The town was chosen to demonstrate archetypal FTTH deployment in a regional area with dispersed housing, providing a live test for similar deployments across the future NBN. The construction phase occurred in early 2011 and the first customer service went live on 27 June 2011.

Notable people
Notable people who are from or who have lived in Willunga include:
 Fanny Elizabeth de Mole, author and illustrator of Wild flowers of South Australia (1861), the first book on wildflowers in that state

References

External links
Site dedicated to Willunga's businesses, sporting clubs and community organisations
Willunga profile Sydney Morning Herald
Willunga Now and Then Local community history wiki. Retrieved 28 December 2014.

Towns in South Australia